Dashkhaneh or Dash Khaneh may refer to:
 Dashkhaneh, Khoshab, Razavi Khorasan Province
 Dash Khaneh, Khoshab, Razavi Khorasan Province
 Dash Khaneh, Mashhad, Razavi Khorasan Province
 Dash Khaneh, West Azerbaijan